Uruguay participated at the 2018 Summer Youth Olympics in Buenos Aires, Argentina from 6 October to 18 October 2018.

Competitors

Athletics

Beach handball

Beach volleyball

Field hockey

Uruguay qualified their national women's team in March 2018.

 Girls' tournament - 1 team of 9 athletes

Girls' Tournament 

 Preliminary round

9th place game

Rowing

Uruguay qualified one boat based on its performance at the American Qualification Regatta.

 Boys' single sculls - 1 athlete

Sailing

Uruguay qualified one boat based on its performance at the Central and South American Nacra 15 Qualifiers.

 Mixed Nacra 15 - 1 boat

References

2018 in Uruguayan sport
Nations at the 2018 Summer Youth Olympics
Uruguay at the Youth Olympics